Brad Stisser (born September 24, 1986) is a retired American soccer player.

Career

College and Amateur

Stisser grew up in Highlands Ranch, Colorado, and attended Highlands Ranch High School, where he captained his team in his senior season, and was named to the Colorado All-State 5A First Team, the Colorado High School Coaches Association Second Team, and the Colorado Second Team All-State squad. He began his college soccer career at Coastal Carolina University before transferring to Loyola Marymount University as a sophomore in 2006.

During his college years Stisser also played with Colorado Rapids U23's and the Real Colorado Foxes in the USL Premier Development League, and was named to the PDL All-Western Conference Team in 2009.

Professional
Stisser signed his first professional contract in 2010 when he was signed by AC St. Louis of the USSF Division 2 Professional League. He made his professional debut on April 17, 2010, in a game against the Austin Aztex, and scored his first professional goal on June 12, 2010 in a game against the Puerto Rico Islanders.

Following the demise of AC St. Louis, Stisser signed with Rochester Rhinos of the USL Pro league on February 22, 2011.

Personal
Brad stems from a soccer family. His father, Scott, is former college player for San Jose State Spartans and his mother, Barbara, played for Chico State Wildcats

References

External links
 AC St. Louis bio
 LMU bio
 2010 InfoSport Soccer Player Profile

1986 births
Living people
American soccer players
Coastal Carolina Chanticleers men's soccer players
Loyola Marymount Lions men's soccer players
Colorado Rapids U-23 players
Real Colorado Foxes players
AC St. Louis players
Rochester New York FC players
Charlotte Eagles players
Atlanta Silverbacks players
Phoenix Rising FC players
USL League Two players
USSF Division 2 Professional League players
USL Championship players
North American Soccer League players
Soccer players from Colorado
People from Highlands Ranch, Colorado
Association football forwards